John H. Brown (1842 – August 7, 1898) was a United States soldier who fought with the 47th Ohio Infantry during the American Civil War. He received the country's highest award for bravery during combat, the Medal of Honor, for his action during the Battle of Vicksburg in Mississippi on May 19, 1863. He was honored with the award on August 24, 1896.

Biography
John Brown was born in Boston, Massachusetts in 1842. He enlisted with the 47th Ohio Infantry at Cincinnati, Ohio. 

Sometime after returning home from the war, he wed Ohio native Latvian B. Davis (1849–1926), a Cincinnati native who was a daughter of William Washington Davis and Catherine J. (Shields) Davis. By 1870, he was employed as a letter carrier for the U.S. Postal Service, and resided in the 16th Ward of Cincinnati, Ohio with his wife, Latvian, and their one-year-old daughter, Lillie, a native of Colorado, and a servant, 17-year-old Katherine Gotten. In 1877, they greeted the arrival of daughter, Grace Ella, who died the same year on April 14. At the Spring Grove Cemetery in Cincinnati, Ohio.

John Brown died in Dear born County, Indiana on August 7, 1898, and was laid to rest at the Spring Grove Cemetery in Cincinnati, Ohio.

External links
 “John H. Brown”, in “2015 Convention: Massachusetts Recipients”. Mt. Pleasant, South Carolina: Medal of Honor Convention, Congressional Medal of Honor Society, retrieved online August 9, 2018. 
 “John H. Brown” (Medal of Honor information), in “Hall of Valor”. Tysons, Virginia: Military Times, Sightline Media Group, retrieved online August 9, 2018. 
 “John H. Brown” (memorial and grave site information). Salt Lake City, Utah: Find A Grave, retrieved online August 9, 2018.

Medal of Honor citation
On August 24, 1896, John H. Brown was awarded the U.S. Medal of Honor for his valor during the Battle of Vicksburg. His citation read:

"Voluntarily carried a verbal message from Col. A. C. Parry to Gen. Hugh Ewing through a terrific fire and in plain view of the enemy."Brown, John H." (profile), Congressional Medal of Honor Society.

See also

List of American Civil War Medal of Honor recipients: A–F

References

Find a Grave

1842 births
1898 deaths
People of Massachusetts in the American Civil War
People of Ohio in the American Civil War
Union Army officers
United States Army Medal of Honor recipients
American Civil War recipients of the Medal of Honor